Connor West (born 7 May 1999) is an Australian rules footballer who plays for the West Coast Eagles in the Australian Football League (AFL). He was recruited by West Coast with the 23rd draft pick in the 2021 mid-season rookie draft.

AFL career
Connor West represented Western Australia at the 2017 AFL Under 18 Championships. He had hoped to be drafted in the 2017 AFL draft, but he was not. He still held hope of being drafted in the AFL after the success of mature age recruits from the WAFL such as Tim Kelly and Bailey Banfield.

West debuted in the West Australian Football League (WAFL) for West Perth against Swan Districts on Saturday, 21 April 2018.

West was recruited by West Coast with the 23rd draft pick in the 2021 mid-season rookie draft, as Jarrod Cameron was placed on the long-term injury list due to a season-ending ankle injury. This selection came as a surprise. He was West Coast's fourth father-son pick in the AFL, as his father, Robbie West played for West Coast in the 1990s. His selection came during a breakout season playing in West Perth's midfield, averaging 27 disposals and over 6 tackles per game. West had played for West Perth at WAFL level since 2018.

West made his debut against  in round 18 of the 2021 AFL season.

Personal life
West is the son of former  and Footscray AFL player Robbie West.

References

External links
 
 
 

1999 births
Living people
West Coast Eagles players
Australian rules footballers from Western Australia
West Perth Football Club players
West Coast Eagles (WAFL) players